The University of Kalamoon is a private, accredited university located in Deir Atiyah An-Nabek District Rif Dimashq Governorate in Syria, located between the Qalamoun Mountains and the Eastern Lebanon Mountains, 88 kilometres (55 miles) north of the capital Damascus.

It is the first private university in Syria, and was founded on August 18, 2003.

Academic agreements
Universities/International Institutions:
  University of Glamorgan
  University of Michigan
  University of Amsterdam
  University of Oklahoma
  University of Paris 8
  Eastern Mediterranean University
  Islamic Azad University
  University of Wyoming
  University of Strasbourg
  National Center for University and Study Services CNOUS
  University of Genoa, CRUIE Research Center for Town Planning and Environmental Engineering
  High School of Communication ENST
  Institute of Political Studies and the National Institute of Political Sciences (Science-PO)
 The Network of Syrian Scientists and Innovators in the Expatriate NOSSTIA
  International Center for Educational Studies (CIEP)
  University of Berlin, Teaching Hospital
  United Nations Volunteer Program

2- Universities/local and Arab institutions:
  Department of Medical Services - Syrian Ministry of Defense
  University of Anbar
  Tishreen University
  Cairo University

In addition to scientific and academic cooperation, these agreements included other important topics, including:
Quality control and development of the academic system and study plans
 Scientific and cultural exchange, including the exchange of scientific publications
 Postgraduate programs, conducting joint scientific research and projects, and organizing specialized conferences.
 Faculty exchange, student exchange, student research support, and training.
Twinning between some faculties of the university and its counterparts in international universities

Faculties 

University of Kalamoon includes nine faculties:
Medicine
Dentistry
Pharmacy
Engineering 
Business & Management
Diplomacy & International relations
Applied Sciences
Health Sciences
Media

See also
List of universities in Syria

References 

Kalamoon
An-Nabek District
Kalamoon
2003 establishments in Syria